The 2018 North Carolina Central Eagles football team represented North Carolina Central University in the 2018 NCAA Division I FCS football season. They were led by first-year interim head coach Granville Eastman. The Eagles played their home games at O'Kelly–Riddick Stadium. They were a member of the Mid-Eastern Athletic Conference (MEAC). They finished the season 5–6, 3–4 in MEAC play to finish in a tie for sixth place.

Previous season
The Eagles finished the 2017 season 7–4, 5–3 in MEAC play to finish in a tie for fourth place.

On December 8, head coach Jerry Mack resigned to become the offensive coordinator at Rice. He finished at North Carolina Central with a four-year record of 31–15.

Preseason

Award watch lists

MEAC preseason poll
In a vote of the MEAC head coaches and sports information directors, the Eagles were picked to finish in third place.

Preseason All-MEAC Teams
The Eagles had nine players selected to the preseason all-MEAC teams. Defensive back Davanta Reynolds was selected as the preseason defensive player of the year.

Offense

1st team

Isaiah Totten – RB

Nick Leverett – OL

2nd team

Josh McCoy – TE

Andrew Dale – OL

3rd team

Xavier McKoy – WR

Defense

1st team

Kawuan Cox – DL

Davanta Reynolds – DB

2nd team

Randy Anyanwu – DL

3rd team

De'Mario Evans – DB

Schedule

Source: Schedule

Game summaries

vs Prairie View A&M

Saint Augustine's

at Duke

Florida A&M

Howard

at Norfolk State

at Delaware State

Edward Waters

at Bethune–Cookman

North Carolina A&T

at South Carolina State

References

North Carolina Central
North Carolina Central Eagles football seasons
North Carolina Central Eagles football